The Cripple Creek-Victor School District RE-1 is a public school district in Teller County, Colorado, United States, based in Cripple Creek.

Schools
Cripple Creek-Victor School District RE-1 has one elementary school and one junior/senior high school.

Elementary schools
Cresson Elementary School

Junior/senior high schools
Cripple Creek-Victor Junior/Senior High School

References

External links

School districts in Colorado
Education in Teller County, Colorado